Steve Darcis (born 13 March 1984) is a Belgian retired professional tennis player. In his career, he won two ATP titles and achieved a career-high singles ranking of world No. 38 on 22 May 2017.

Personal life
Steve Darcis was born in Liège the son of Marie Agnes, a sports instructor, and Alain Darcis, a tennis coach. He has a sister named Céline. Growing up, he looked up at Pete Sampras. On 29 May 2013, his girlfriend Lauranne gave birth to daughter Camille.

Career

Juniors
As a junior, Darcis compiled a singles win–loss record of 73–32, reaching as high as No. 8 in the junior world singles rankings in May 2002 (and No. 15 in doubles). He reached the semifinals at the 2002 Wimbledon Championships boys' singles event.

2007–2009
Darcis won his first ATP World Tour event at the Dutch Open in July 2007 and achieved his first top-100 ranking on 26 November 2007 after winning a Challenger event in Finland.

Darcis competed at the 2008 Australian Open and the French Open, losing in the first round in both. He and Olivier Rochus, however, reached the quarterfinals of the doubles tournament at the French Open. He reached the second round at the US Open. He won a second ATP event at Memphis in March, defeating Robin Söderling in the final. He reached the final of the Dutch Open again, but lost to Albert Montañés.

In 2009, Darcis played in three Grand Slam tournaments, the Australian Open, Wimbledon, and the US Open, reaching the second round only at Wimbledon. He also reached the quarterfinals at Queen's Club.

2010–present
Darcis qualified for the 2010 Qatar Open, retiring in his third-round match against Rafael Nadal. He failed to qualify for the Australian Open.

At the 2011 French Open, Darcis advanced to the main draw as a qualifier, and in the first round pulled off a shock victory over 22nd seed Michaël Llodra. Darcis followed this up by beating Philipp Petzschner, to advance into the third round, where he was defeated by Frenchman Gaël Monfils in straight sets.

Darcis made the quarterfinals in Vienna, beating Nikolay Davydenko on the way, but was defeated by Daniel Brands.

In 2012, Darcis made the final of the Dallas Challenger tournament but lost to Jesse Levine. At the Eastbourne International, he defeated Matthew Ebden, Marcos Baghdatis, and Marinko Matosevic to face Andy Roddick in the semifinals. Darcis retired a set down at 1–3 due to a back injury.

At the 2012 Summer Olympics, Darcis beat Tomáš Berdych in the first round.

In the first round at the 2013 Wimbledon Championships on 24 June, Darcis defeated fifth-seeded Rafael Nadal in straight sets. This made him the first player ever to defeat Nadal in the first round of any major tournament. Darcis was ranked 130 places lower than Nadal. At the time, he was the lowest-ranked player ever to beat Nadal in a Grand Slam tournament. It was announced prior to his second-round match that he had withdrawn due to a shoulder injury sustained in the Nadal match.

In the 2017 Australian Open, Darcis defeated Sam Groth and Diego Schwartzman both in four sets to reach the third round, tying his best Grand Slam result to date (in singles). He was taken out by Andreas Seppi despite winning the first set of the match.

In October 2019, Darcis confirmed he plans to retire after the 2020 Australian Open due to elbow pain since the 2019 Wimbledon Championships.

ATP career finals

Singles: 3 (2 titles, 1 runner-up)

Challenger and Futures finals

Singles: 39 (19–20)

Doubles: 10 (6–4)

Performance timelines

Singles
Current through the 2019 Swiss Open Gstaad.

''* Darcis withdrew before the second round match at the 2013 Wimbledon.

Doubles

Wins over top-10 opponents

References

External links

 
 
 
Darcis Recent Match Results
Darcis World Ranking History

1984 births
Living people
Belgian male tennis players
Olympic tennis players of Belgium
Sportspeople from Liège
Walloon sportspeople
Tennis players at the 2008 Summer Olympics
Tennis players at the 2012 Summer Olympics